All of a Sudden Norma is a lost 1919 American silent comedy-drama film directed by Howard C. Hickman and starring Mrs. Hickman, aka Bessie Barriscale who produced the film. It was distributed by Robertson-Cole Corporation.

Cast
Bessie Barriscale as Norma Brisbane
Joseph J. Dowling as Hamilton Brisbane
Albert R. Cody as Cuthbert Van Zelt
R. Henry Grey as Oliver Garrett
Frank Leigh as Duke of Duffield
Melbourne MacDowell as Emerson Trent

References

External links

1919 films
American silent feature films
Lost American films
Films directed by Howard C. Hickman
American black-and-white films
Film Booking Offices of America films
1910s English-language films
1919 comedy-drama films
1919 lost films
Lost comedy-drama films
1910s American films
Silent American comedy-drama films